Blue Genes is the fifth story in the "Kate Brannigan Series" written by Scottish author Val McDermid. Written in 1996 the book has mature content and was advised not for younger readers as it has themes of sexual responses and death.

Plot 
Kate Brannigan, a private investigator based in Manchester, England, confronts four problems simultaneously. She is commissioned to catch two fraudsters who have been cheating recently bereaved people by promising high quality gravestones at a reduced price if a down payment is made that evening, then disappearing with the money. A neo-punk rock group 'Dan Druff and the Scabby Heided Bains' commission her to trace protection racketeers who are sabotaging their flyposting and gigs.  Her business partner Bill has fallen in love with an Australian and plans to marry and move to Australia, closing the detective agency as he owns most of the shares. Her best friend Alexis, a lesbian journalist also asks for Kate's help. Her girlfriend Chris is pregnant following an illegal treatment using genetic material from one woman's ovum to make another pregnant. The doctor responsible for the fertility treatment has been murdered. Alexis and Chris fear that the murder investigation will lead to their being exposed and their baby being taken from them, and beg Kate to use her skills to cover their traces.

Brannigan darts around Manchester at a furious pace coping with all four issues, frequently playing fast and loose with the law sometimes to uphold and sometimes to frustrate it, and aided by a cast of engaging characters such as Richard her rock journalist boyfriend, Gizmo, an unsociable hacker open to pecuniary incentive, Giles the yuppie financier, her friend DI Della Prentice, Dennis, a burglar doing time who is her key advisor on current trends in crime and a selection of the Northern English lesbian community.

Awards 

The book has won no current awards but was runner-up for the Young Adults book of Fictional Events.

References

1996 British novels
Novels by Val McDermid
British crime novels
HarperCollins books